Predatory marriage is the practice of marrying an elderly person exclusively for the purpose of gaining access to their estate upon their death. While the requirements for mental capacity to make a valid will are high, in most jurisdictions the requirements for entering into a valid marriage are much lower; even a person suffering dementia may enter into marriage. In many jurisdictions, a marriage arrangement will invalidate any previous will left by the person, resulting in the spouse inheriting the estate.

In the United Kingdom a campaign, Predatory Marriage UK (originally known as Justice for Joan) was started, working to change laws and procedures around marriage to reduce this practice, supported by lawyer Sarah Young of Ridley and Hall. The local MP, Fabian Hamilton MP, introduced a bill in Parliament during 2018 entitled the Marriage and Civil Partnership (Consent) Bill, to establish that marriage should no longer always revoke a previous will and have introduced other protections against predatory marriage. The bill was passed but ran out of parliamentary time, but work is continuing.

See also
 Elder financial abuse
 Sham marriage

References

Sham marriage
Elder law
Abuse
Psychological manipulation